Rolf Müller (December 15 1940 – February 18, 2015, in Munich) was a German graphic designer. He was a member of the Alliance Graphique Internationale. He worked on visual design for the 1972 Summer Olympics. The central themes of his creative work were corporate design, the development of information and orientation systems, posters, publications and exhibitions.

Biography
Müller studied at the Ulm School of Design and then worked for the Swiss graphic designer Josef Müller-Brockmann. From 1967 to 1972 he worked with the team of Otl Aicher, which developed the visual identity of the 1972 Summer Olympics in Munich and its mascot Waldi. He became deputy design officer of the organizing committee for the games. In 1972 he founded the Rolf Müller office for visual communication in Munich. Rolf Müller designed and realized visual appearances, developed information and orientation systems, designed publications and posters. For Heidelberger Druckmaschinen he developed the magazine HQ (High Quality), which at the time set standards in printing technology and design. He has lived in Munich since 1967 and has a daughter, the designer Anna Lena von Helldorff. Since the end of the 1990s he took a teaching position, u. a. at the Ravensburg School of Design. In 2008 he received the design award of the City of Munich, and in 2009 a retrospective of his work took place. In 2014 the monograph Rolf Müller: Stories, Systems, Signs which he helped to edit, was published.

Works 

 Corporate Design of the city Leverkusen, 1971–1992
 Broschüre über Willy Brandt, 1971, Endauflage 1,2 Mio., das erfolgreichste Wahlkampfportät seiner Zeit
 Offizielles Plakat der Kieler Woche, 1972
 Information system of the Stadthaus in Bonn, 1973–1977
 Design-Objekt Spiegelfaltung am Stadthaus in Bonn, 1974–1977 (Aufstellung 1979)
 Information system of the Offizierschule der Luftwaffe in Fürstenfeldbruck, 1976–1979
 Gabor Schuhmode, Rosenheim, 1977–1987
 Ausstattung 11. Olympischer Kongress Baden-Baden, 1981
 Corporate Design Bavaria Film, Munich, 1980–1989
 Corporate Design cultural center Gasteig, 1982–1984 
 Corporate Design der Drägerwerk Aktiengesellschaft, Lübeck, 1983–2000
 HQ High Quality, Zeitschrift über das Gestalten, das Drucken und das Gedruckte, Heidelberger Druckmaschinen, 1985–1998
 Corporate Design MBB, Munich, 1988–1994
 Corporate Design IBA, Internationale Bauausstellung Emscher Park, Gelsenkirchen, 1990–1994
 Public relation Flughafen München GmbH, 1985–1993
 Innenansichten unseres Parlaments. Der 12., 13. und 14. Deutsche Bundestag. Official book of the Federal Republic of Germany, 1993–2000
 EXPO 2000 Sachsen-Anhalt, Dessau, 1996–1998
 Prinzregententheater Munich, 1996
 Corporate Design of the city Kufstein, 1996–1998
 Corporate Design Bayerische Staatsgemäldesammlungen, Munich, 1996–1998
 Poster Kunstgewerbeverein, Munich, 2001
 Brochures Allianz AG, Munich, ab 1999
 Corporate Design Links und rechts der Ems, Regionale 2004, 2002–2004

Awards 
 gold medal from the Art Directors Club of New York 1989
 German Prize for Communication Design 1993: Award for the highest design quality
 Die 100 besten Plakate des Jahres 1997 des Verbandes der Grafik-Designer e.V. for the poster Glückskinder
 Book Art Foundation: the most beautiful books 1995 and 1998.

Gallery

Publication 
 Jens Müller (Hrsg.): Rolf Müller – Geschichten, Systeme, Zeichen – Stories, Systems, Marks. Band 7 der Buchreihe A5, Lars Müller Publishers, Zürich 2014, .

External links

 Official website
 Former Employees: Designblog
 Typolexikon: Contribution from Wolfgang Beinert
 vimeo: A5+ Rolf Müller (2014): Interview (Video)
 Andreas Bohnenstengel: Impressions

References

1940 births
2015 deaths
German contemporary artists
German designers
German graphic designers
Artists from Munich
Academic staff of the Ulm School of Design